Proud Prophet was a  war game played by the United States that began on June 20, 1983, and was designed by Thomas Schelling. The simulation was played in real time during the Cold War. Proud Prophet was essentially played to test out various proposals and strategies, in response to the Soviet Union's military buildup. There were advocates for a number of strategies, which varied from demonstration nuclear attacks, limited nuclear war, and decapitation attacks. It was not possible for the United States to pursue each of these strategies. President Ronald Reagan and his administration were faced with the dilemma of figuring out how the United States should respond to the Soviet Union's large nuclear programs, while finding which strategy would be most effective.

The wargame, and the usage of wargames in general, demonstrate the importance of thinking about the unthinkable by running through scenarios and planning appropriate responses to opposing nuclear strikes. The game simulated conflict in a number of regions, from East Asia to Europe and in the Mediterranean and the Middle East. The simulation consisted of 200 military personnel and politicians with only twelve days of actual play. Stretching the twelve days of gameplay over several week periods, personnel involved in the simulation were forced to make critical strategic and diplomatic decisions to test the effectiveness of the United States strike plan. Heightened tensions due to the ongoing Cold War made this simulation the most realistic in United States military history. For the first time ever, the secretary of defense and the chairman of the joint chiefs of staff took part in the game, although their participation was concealed. One of the main purposes of the simulation was to test the response of the National Command Authority's (NCA) decision making when dealing with many different situations at once.

Although Proud Prophet was intended to help senior officials test their nuclear strategies, it was apparent that many of the concepts in place were incompatible with current military capabilities. Many important parts of this simulation saw limited use of de-escalation tactics. If a risk of a war did occur, many military advisors saw the use of nuclear missiles as the deterring factor when dealing with the Soviet Union. The idea behind this concept was that Soviet forces would seek ceasefire if the West moved to use nuclear weapons. The final outcome of the Proud Prophet war game would show the need to resolve global issues in times of war or potential war. The outcome of an all-out nuclear war is the total destruction of both sides involved, and a death toll nearly reaching half a billion with the remaining dying from starvation or lethal doses of radiation. The government file for Proud Prophet was not declassified until December 20, 2012, and was only declassified in part.

Educational objectives  
The educational objectives discussed based on Section II, Background Information, of the declassified Proud Prophet government document.
 The main objective was to expose the politico-military game players to make difficult decisions with different levels of uncertainty
 Players and observers were to learn more about the possible consequences of each decision made
 Overall, gain insight to what can start a war
 Explore the effects of using conventional and unconventional warfare for different situations where the enemy may be either vulnerable or prepared
 Figure out the best methods to terminate the hostilities

Commands and agencies involved  

The list of organizations involved are found in Section II, Background Information, of the declassified Proud Prophet government document.
 United States Department of Defense
 United States Department of State
 Central Intelligence Agency
 Defense Intelligence Agency
 Joint Chiefs of Staff
 United States Department of the Army
 United States Department of the Navy
 United States Department of the Air Force
 United States Department of Transportation
 United States Coast Guard
 U.S. Atlantic Command
 U.S. European Command
 U.S. Pacific Command
 U.S. Readiness Command
 U.S. Southern Command
 Strategic Air Command
 Military Airlift Command
 Military Traffic Management Command
 Military Sealift Command
 Defense Nuclear Agency
 National Defense University
 Army War College
 Air War College
 Naval War College
 Army National Guard
 Air National Guard
 Army Reserve
 Naval Reserve
 Marine Corps Reserve
 Air Force Reserve
 Coast Guard Reserve
 Army Intelligence and Security Command
 5th Psychological Operations Group
 United States Army Reserve
 Team B

Lead-up to Proud Prophet

Background 
The antagonism of the Cold War forced the United States leadership to contemplate the eventuality of a nuclear war, and how that decision may affect the American people. By the early 1980s, the Soviet Union had been on a two-decade arms buildup, including its nuclear and political arsenal. The question facing the United States was the best way to respond to this buildup. A number of strategies were proposed, including launch-on-warning, demonstration nuclear attacks, limited nuclear war, decapitation attacks on Soviet command and control, shifting a war into the Far East by attacking Soviet bases there, weapons in space, NATO armies charging into Eastern Europe and recruiting the Polish and Czech armies to help, and having China attack the Soviet Union in a two-front war. The multitude of proposed strategies necessitated an evaluation of their feasibility and practicality. There was much debate on this issue, which came to a head when Andrew W. Marshall, the director of net assessment, suggested a group is set up to help the Secretary of Defense assess the various strategies he was presented with and explore new options. This group consisted of military officers from each of the armed services, as well as senior civilians and consultants. These individuals would be granted access to the resources that the National War College had to offer, with no military interference.

However, this idea was not very popular with many generals, which led to the formulation of the Strategic Concepts Development Center (SCDC). The Secretary of State at the time, Caspar Weinberger, brought in Phillip A. Karber as the founding director, asking him to bring in the best and brightest strategists that were not ideological and represented a broad range of bipartisan views. This whole operation had to be done with the utmost confidentiality, making it that much harder. Soon after, the suggestion of a war game was brought up.

KAL-007 

The Soviet Union lived in significant fear of a possible World War Three, and because of this, tended to have a hair trigger when it came to reacting to an event.  Hence, the threat of a nuclear war was a very real possibility, even if the reasons behind it are misunderstood. The Soviet Union was ready to go at any time, especially after being scared many times for smaller reasons.  On the night of September 1, 1983, a civilian Boeing 747 en route to South Korea passed into Soviet airspace near the Siberian coast.  A Sukhoi Su-15 interceptor aircraft piloted by Gennadi Osipovich targeted the civilian aircraft and shot it down with two missiles.  The Soviets claimed that they knew it was a civilian aircraft, however, they said it would be very easy to convert a civilian aircraft into an intelligence-gathering platform.  The Soviets claimed they believed they had a justification to shoot down this aircraft because they perceived it to be a hostile intruder. There was one American on board, Larry McDonald who was a United States House of Representative member. Oleg Gordievsky believes that the Soviet Union mistook the civilian airliner to be a United States Boeing RC-135, which is a reconnaissance gathering aircraft which looks very similar to a Boeing 747 due to the fact that it has four engines and a wide body similar to the airliner.  This is refuted by the pilots of the attacking Soviet aircraft claiming that he knew it was a civilian jet, but he shot it down anyway because it could have been easily converted for reconnaissance.  The attitude of the Soviets towards anything that might be perceived as a threat was devolving more and more towards a 'shoot first, ask questions later' mentality.  While it may have been uncalled for, Soviets were on edge about everything at this point. This would prove to be incredibly dangerous in the impending strategic nuclear war exercises about to be conducted by the United States and its NATO allies.

Able Archer 83 

Able Archer 83 took place between November 2–11, 1983.  This was a North Atlantic Treaty Organization (N.A.T.O.) strategic arms exercise conducted by the United States government in order to simulate an escalating nuclear conflict. Staffs walked through the procedural drill which included asking permission from N.A.T.O political authorities to fire nuclear weapons. The codes were changed for Able Archer as there were new message formats and periods of radio silence. Able Archer 83 occurred just two months after the shootdown incident of Korean Air Lines Flight 007.  The United States was simulating the deployment and use of the Pershing II nuclear missile system that was being developed at the time.  The Soviets suspected the United States of performing a surprise nuclear attack with the Pershing II system, despite the fact that the Pershing II missiles were not delivered to Europe until November 22, eleven days after the conclusion of Able Archer 83.  The Soviets believed the United States had determined that a nuclear war was technically winnable.  The reason behind this rationale by the Soviet Union was related to the fact that the United States had just recently upgraded its Minuteman III ICBM to the Minuteman IIIA.  This ICBM was several times more accurate and had twice the yield of its predecessors, thus making Soviet hardened nuclear silos a viable target.  That same year, the United States also introduced the Trident C-4 submarine-launched ballistic missile.  All of these factors combined to make the Able Archer 83 test an incredibly stressful and dangerous time.

Able Archer was a standard military exercise that was performed annually by the United States.  Unfortunately, in 1983, the aforementioned factors all came into play at the wrong time, and Soviet nuclear threat perceptions were at a critical level.  While the United States Chiefs of Staff remained largely indifferent to this Soviet perception, the exercise was nonetheless "toned down" in order to assuage fears of impending WWIII.  President Reagan and Vice President Bush were removed from participating in the exercise, however, it still remained one of the most realistic exercises to date, with a complete simulation of NATO forces going to DEFCON 1.  The Soviet leadership's suspicion of Able Archer 83 as an attempt at a surprise nuclear attack masquerading as an exercise grew with intelligence collections of United States message traffic which was "unusual" in its message formats and communications procedures.  The unusual message procedures led Soviet leadership to believe that Able Archer may not be an exercise at all.  This was coupled with a "too literal" interpretation of the scenario, whereby NATO forces were perceived by the Soviets to be at DEFCON 1.  In actuality, the NATO forces were never at DEFCON 1, it was all simulated, however Soviet leadership still mistook the exercise for a real event.

RYAN 

Project VRYAN, or RYAN as it is more commonly known, is the Russian acronym for surprise nuclear attack.  It was the largest Soviet intelligence-gathering program ever mounted in peacetime.  The objective of RYAN was to monitor the United States and its NATO allies for any indicator whatsoever of an impending nuclear first strike.  Project RYAN had the highest priority over any other intelligence-gathering initiative in the Soviet Union at the time, including any currently being undertaken by the KGB or the GRU.  There were hundreds of indicators that were monitored by Project RYAN, including the United States economy.  More specifically, any large-scale purchase of gold by the United States might indicate an impending nuclear apocalypse.

Traditional Soviet doctrine called for a first strike in order to make a nuclear war technically winnable.  The Soviets kept most of their missiles in silos located throughout the country, whereas the United States had the majority of their warheads deployed on submarines.  This fact contributed to the Soviet Union's increasing paranoia towards the United States, and more specifically, any exercises or war games the United States might participate in.  Through this mindset came the philosophy of a Launched On Tactical Warning (LOTW) strike by the Soviets.  This was essentially an automatic launch system that would deploy the Soviet Union's warheads at any sign of incoming United States missiles via radar or satellite detection.  Because of Project VRYAN, any misreading of western intentions could have had disastrous consequences.  The perception in the Soviet Union at the time was that the United States would stop at nothing to destroy them, including nuclear annihilation.  KGB officers who were familiar with the West had no real sway in convincing others that there would never be a nuclear strike.

The directives of Project RYAN underscore how deeply rooted the idea of a Western first strike was in the minds of high-ranking Soviet officials.  They truly believed that nuclear war was imminent, and the fear of a surprise nuclear attack was rapidly growing.  Project RYAN was not established so the Soviets could strike second, it was to ensure the Soviets had the necessary information in order to strike first.

Team B

Background 
Team B was a military defense group formed in the late 1970s. This defense group was formed with the Central Intelligence Agency. The government was already having concerns about the Soviet Union's nuclear weapons, so they created this alliance to see what might be coming at the United States from Soviet powers.  
Team B was the reaction to the serious apprehension of the Soviet Union who believed that they could possibly be on the brink of World War lll. Many members of the President's Foreign Intelligence Advisory Board thought it was absurd to do something like this. The main purpose of Team B was to observe Soviet capabilities for the purpose of informing United States policy.

Reagan administration

Background 
Ronald Reagan, President of the United States from 1981 to 1989, was elected when tensions between the United States and Soviet Union were again escalating after the Détente of the 1970s.

Despite treaties and economics being used as a means to weaken the Soviet Union, the Reagan Administration still had concerns on whether or not the Cold War would escalate to nuclear war. In an attempt to be prepared for the worst, a number of strategies were studied to test all avenues of this war—from peaceful negotiations to Mutual Assured Destruction (MAD). The administration used techniques such as talks and games to determine the nature of the war and the temperament of the Soviet Union.

Concerned by the growing number of nuclear weapons possessed by the nuclear armed nations, Reagan became ever more interested in finding a way to rid the world of nuclear threat. This dislike for nuclear weapons, however, extends all the way back to the start of his first term in which, upon the briefing of his different available nuclear strategies he was rendered sick, the meeting having to be rescheduled. 1983 proved to be a very tense year for the Reagan administration as things became unstable with the Soviets while Reagan continued to seek out ways to bring about peace whether or not the solution involved nuclear war.

In June 1983, Reagan's Secretary of Defense, Caspar Weinberger, his chairman of the Joint Chiefs of Staff, John William Vessey Jr., as well as dozens of high-ranking military personnel participated in a classified war game known as Proud Prophet which worked in real-time at the National War College. It was not the first of its kind, but did prove to be one of the most beneficial in determining the efficacy of America's nuclear strategy. In this game, they utilized each of America's nuclear strike tactics which included:

 Launch on warning: this was cut out almost immediately for fears of turning nuclear codes over to a computer which simply relied on a radar
 Horizontal escalation: this involved attacking Soviet outposts to encourage a response and counterattack that would diminish the number of nuclear weapons. It was dismissed because the Soviets did not seem to care if they lost their satellite territories.
 Early use: this was shown to be pointless because as the American team threatened the Soviet team, hoping the Soviets felt threatened and surrendered, instead felt threatened and responded with massive nuclear response
 Tit-for-Tat: this proved irresponsible as the two sides volleyed nuclear weapons back and forth until MAD was achieved

In each of these instances, tested repeatedly and with different factors that would affect outcomes, the results were grim. Outcomes of the least deadly strategy resulted in a base level of half a billion deaths and more to come in the aftermath of a nuclear fallout contaminated and annihilated the northern hemisphere. In response to this information, the Reagan Administration changed their rhetoric and strategies changed, insisting on a permanent prevention of nuclear warfare.

A number of steps were taken to ensure the end of a nuclear threat from the Soviet and American fronts alike. Understanding that, realistically, a threat still existed and in an attempt to protect the United States, Reagan initiated his Strategic Defense Initiative (nicknamed the Star Wars program) as well as more intensive talks to bring about a nuclear freeze. These tensions came to a head when he discussed the Intermediate-Range Nuclear Forces Treaty with Soviet Secretary-General Mikhail Gorbachev, which helped to reduce some of the nuclear weapons on both of the two opposing sides, slowing the arms race that had been growing at this time.

Political Background 
Tensions amongst the Soviets and the United States were incredibly high in 1983.  Project RYAN had been collecting data on the United States for years, attempting to predict a first strike, and playing into the paranoia experienced by the Soviet Union at the time.  The United States had been conducting Able Archer war games annually, which culminated in the most realistic war game according to the Soviets with Able Archer 83.  The disparity between the Soviets and the United States' beliefs concerning nuclear war was incredibly large.  President Reagan recognized this disparity, and the increasing Soviet defenses and suspicion.  He is quoted in his diary as saying: I feel the Soviets are so defense-minded, so paranoid about being attacked that without being in any way soft on them, we ought to tell them no one here has any intention of doing anything like that.  What have they got that anyone would want?  George is going on ABC right after its big nuclear bomb film Sunday night.  It shows why we must keep doing what we're doing.   This thought process is directly opposite of what the Soviets believed at the time. Anatoly Dobrynin, the Soviet Ambassador at the time, truly believed that the possibility of nuclear war sharply increased in the 1980s.  The Soviets truly believed the Reagan administration was headed for war.  President Reagan believed that the Soviets were truly afraid of the United States and what they were capable of.  Reagan is again quoted in his diary explaining this:I picked his brains [President Mika Špiljak of Yugoslavia] about the Soviet Union.  He was ambassador there for a time.  He believes that coupled with their expansionist philosophy, they are also insecure and genuinely frightened of us.  He also believes that if we opened them up a bit, their leading citizens would get braver about proposing changes in their system.  I'm going to pursue this.It's clear that the United States did not have any intentions of launching a nuclear first strike against the Soviets, but were having a significant amount of trouble communicating this.  Project RYAN continued to feed into Soviet fears that the United States was being dishonest, and Able Archer 83 simply fanned the flames.

Soviet administration

Background
The leader of the Communist Party of the Soviet Union in the time leading up to the war games was Leonid Brezhnev. He was in power from October 1964 to November 1982. Tensions were beginning to rise after the Détente of the 1970s. Tensions rose due to Moscow harboring a growing concern that their arsenal of nuclear weapons, which rivaled that of the United States, had been the factor urging NATO in its quest for military supremacy. The Russian administration believed this quest was pursued solely to upset the equilibrium that was recently acquired by the Soviet Union with their nuclear weapons and conventional power. The Soviets viewed the building up of U.S. forces as an attempt to ‘blackmail’ the Soviet Union into submission. This led the Soviets to “enhance the value of nuclear weapons” as a war fighting weapon. However, in 1982, the Soviet Union renounced the first use of nuclear weapons, but the declaration did not affect the soviets war plan, as they still considered a preemptive strike if authentic information was acquired. In March 1979, the Soviet Minister of Defense, Marshal Dmitrii Ustinov anticipated that NATO would easily be able to enlist the help of China and France, from that he deduced that NATO could be ready for war in as little as 48 hours. In December 1979, the Warsaw Pact viewed NATO's motives as being driven by their desire to gain military superiority. These views were fueled and supported by the intelligence that was being gathered at the time. In February 1980, the head of the Committee for State Security (KGB), Yurii V. Andropov, raised concern over the “U.S. bid for military superiority”. A meeting in early 1981 between Andropov and Brezhnev resulted in the formation of RYAN (as detailed above), with the intent of gaining enough intelligence to foretell the comings of a nuclear attack. In 1981, Soviets obtained the war plan for the U.S. 5th Army Corps in Germany which hinted they had the ability to stop the Soviet's forces with the use of tactical nuclear weapons. With this information, the Soviet Union with its conventional method of war was being threatened. The chief of the Soviet General Staff, Nikolai V. Ogarkov, argued that the Soviets could win the war if they were the ones who struck with tactical nuclear weapons first. To counter this view, the Defense Minister, Dmitrii Ustinov disapproved of those who believed in winning a nuclear war and Brezhnev also believed that winning a war would be impossible. Colonel Vitalii N. Tsygichko was tasked with illustrating the results of what the outcome would be if nuclear war broke out and showed that the use of nuclear weapons was not an option. In contrast to the U.S, the Soviet generals and marshals were the ones pushing for war, whereas in the U.S., it was the civilians and politicians. In November 1982, Andropov was appointed to General Secretary of the Communist Party of the Soviet Union (CPSU) after the death of Brezhnev. Andropov found it hard to distinguish whether or not the United States were intending to blackmail the Soviet Union or preparing to use nuclear weapons. Andropov placed the blame on the west for the continuing arms race that was sliding down a slope that would ultimately end in war. In February 1983, the threat level under RYAN was increased, just after a Warsaw Pact meeting, and the country was on high alert for any surprise attacks. On September 26, 1983, in the aptly named 'Petrov Incident', Stanislav Petrov was an on-duty officer in a Soviet nuclear warning center where there was a purported launch of American nuclear missiles. Petrov opted not to alert the Soviet high command because the system malfunctioned indicating that the Soviets narrowly avoided war. Ronald Reagan's speech on March 23, 1983, outlaid the plan for ‘Star Wars’ which served to infuriate the Soviet Union, with Andropov proclaiming that the United States was continuing their search for more ways to turn a nuclear war in their favor, instead of relying on Mutually assured destruction (MAD). The Soviet Union was aware of previous NATO training exercises, however not enough intelligence was obtained to prove the harmlessness of the Able Archer 83 exercises, thus leading to rising tensions.

The beginning of Proud Prophet 
After the idea of a war game was proposed, Karber brought in a Harvard professor, Thomas Schelling, to help design a game testing out the various proposals and strategies listed above. Schelling told Weinberg shortly after accepting the position that he believed the senior government leaders were incredibly unprepared to deal with making important decisions, should one of the strategies realistically happen. Weinberg was willing to be the first senior National Security leader to participate in the United States wartime simulation game as long as Karber designed a secret way for him and the chairman of the Joint Chiefs to do so and as long as he designed the game to test the United States war plans and as a learning exercise and experience for the secretary. Weinberg worried that the "fishbowl effect", fear of public exposure and embarrassment, would disturb or distort the decisions made by players within the simulation.

Another major concern that led to the confidentiality of this game involved the need to prevent a media leakage that could potentially disturb Soviet Union leaders or even leaders from allied countries. During the summer of 1983, the United States and Soviet Union's relations were not especially great so President Reagan and his administration had to be very careful of media coverage and avoid negative headlines that could be potentially misinterpreted or misconstrued.

Schelling's previous wartime games like the crisis games at the Rand Corporation in the 1950s and at the U.S. National Security Council in the early 1960s incorporated the help from staffers from think tanks, the Pentagon, and the CIA while his new game was designed where only decision-makers like the secretary of defense and the chairman of the Joint Chiefs of Staff could play. Karber had ordered that a "Thucydidean Chronicler" independently observe the decision making on both sides of the game's spectrum; they would do so by wandering around the game and recording their impressions.

The game 
Proud Prophet began on May 2, 1983, and began with a full day of simulation. The game was played in real-time at the National Defense University that focused on the mobilization and industrial preparedness. Actual top-secret war plans were incorporated as this game was the most realistic exercise involving nuclear weapons by the United States government during the cold war. The intense game involved the President of the United States or his stand-in to run through a procedural checklist with choices of prescribed options without communication or bargaining with the Soviet Union or even Allies.

Played in real-time at the secret facility of the National War College, the game continued for two weeks, around the clock, with most of it taking place in Washington. Many high ranking military officers were in contact with military command posts across the globe via top-secret links playing out the scenarios in East Asia, the Mediterranean, Europe, and the Middle East. With security being of top priority, only a limited number of individuals knew who was actually involved which prevented any kind of media leak.

Every morning, Karber traveled across the Potomac River to the Pentagon or used a red phone to call the secretary and chairman to discuss the scenario being played out. They then talked about what actions needed to be taken by discussing the United States' policy, possible alliance reactions, as well as potential strategic moves that should be taken. These scenarios took place so reaction times could be improved if something were to happen.

During the games, many scenarios were played out, especially the strategies mentioned earlier on, such as launch on warning, which did not make the cut; the idea of leaving a launch decision up to a computer was in no one's best interest. Point blank attacking Moscow also did not make the cut, considering just how many nuclear weapons the Soviets had. They would only strike back. Deploying NATO armies seemed like a good idea before the games, until the US realized that the taking of one piece of land meant they would lose much more than they gained. Limited nuclear attacks were also tossed. The Soviets only interpreted the strikes as attacks on their culture and struck back, rather than see that the United States was quite capable of winning and give up. The games had the United States striking back, which resulted in all-out nuclear Armageddon with more than half a billion people killed, leaving a great part of the northern hemisphere uninhabitable. Needless to say, this strategy scared everyone and was tossed as well.

The results of the game were disturbing to all of those involved.  Russia, Europe, and the United States were all completely destroyed.  Most of the northern hemisphere would now be rendered uninhabitable, and 500 million people would be dead.  It was estimated that half a billion people would also die from radiation and starvation in the months to follow the strikes.  All of this would happen simply because the Secretary of State (Caspar Weinberger) and the Chairman of the Joint Chiefs of Staff (John William Vessey Jr.) followed the United States' strategy in place for such an event.  This exercise served to highlight the weaknesses in the United States nuclear strategy.  The number of civilian casualties along with the complete destruction of three regions called for a complete revamping of how the United States would handle a situation like this developing.  Proud Prophet also completely changed President Reagan's nuclear rhetoric concerning the Soviets.  With the knowledge of Proud Prophet in mind, and the absolute catastrophe that nuclear war would bring, President Reagan could reevaluate how he dealt with the Soviets, and focus more on de-escalation rather than nuclear strong-arming.

Red Team (Soviets) 
The Red Team was composed for Proud Prophet in order to strategize and take action based on what they thought the Soviets would do during the different scenarios. They were essentially the Soviet Team during Proud Prophet.

Red Team laws of war  
The following laws of war were followed by the Red Team and are found in Section V, Red Strategic Plan, of the declassified Proud Prophet government document. Marxism–Leninism is the foundation for the laws of war. There were four theoretical laws that the Soviets believed war depended on.

1. The war and its end result depend on strictly military forces of combatants at the beginning of the war. This is based on the Soviets analyzing both World Wars and the invention of nuclear weapons that are capable of changing the course of the war significantly.

2. The war and its end result depends mainly on military potentials of combatants. This law places emphasis on the meaning of "military potentials" and how it does not strictly apply to military forces. Instead, the Soviets went further in depth with this term by including scientific, industrial, and research base along with workforce, technical and education levels of the population. They are considered military potentials based on the potential of administrative agencies being able to utilize these resources within the military.

3. The war and its end result depend on the political context. This law is based on population elements and how politics plays a role within the population. In order to be ready for war, the Soviets prepare psychologically, politically, and ideologically. The structure of the war must be done in a manner to maximally use propaganda throughout the war.

4. The war and its end result depend on the moral-political and psychological capabilities of the population and military of the combatants. This law depends on how the political figures manipulate the reasoning of the war to mentally prepare the military and population. This is done by making the enemy seem unjust and educating the population about how the effect of nuclear weapons not as bad as it seems. Basically, it is a mental preparation for the nation as a whole so that there is 'positive energy' going into the war.

Red national goals 
The national goals are found in Section V, Red Strategic Plan, of the declassified Proud Prophet government document. These were the goals that the Red Team wanted to achieve so any action taken during Proud Prophet was to be a step forward towards their goals.

1. Preserve the power of the ruling Communist Party.

2. Defend the homeland and ensure progress toward communism.

3. Defend acquired territories (Warsaw Pact countries) and further assimilate them.

4. Exploit every opportunity to expand RED control and disrupt capitalist control in order to shift the correlation of forces in favor of RED.

Red Team strategic principles 

The following are found in Section V, Red Strategic Plan, of the declassified Proud Prophet government document. The 14 basic strategic principles that the Red Team followed were:

1. Foment dissension in enemy camp by supporting one or more internal dissident movements.

2. Do not support an ally if, in doing so, you will make him too strong.

3. Use the forces of allies, or even better one's enemy, to defeat the primary opponent.

4. Do not let your enemy grow too weak too soon if a third party will be the primary beneficiary rather than yourself.

5. Use propaganda and demands for concessions incessantly on the principle that familiarity with uncongenial subjects eventually breeds readiness to take them for granted.

6. Use terror on prospective areas to be conquered so the population will greet your conquest with relief.

7. Be flexible in approach and accept compromises as the basis for the new demands.

8. Use peace talks and truces as a time for regrouping, employing deception, and taking whatever advantage the opponent will tolerate.

9. Avoid two-front wars.

10. Be patient, do not ask or everything at once. Ensure thorough consolidation of previous positions before advancing.

11. Build such an overwhelming military power that an opponent will realize he must not accommodate.

12. Combine offensive and defensive methods, tools, and weapons in a coordinated manner designed to ensure retention of the initiative.

13. Use psychological technique known as "reflexive control" to lead an opponent into unwittingly doing what you want.

14. Remember the critical importance of time as a key factor in warfare. Establish time-phased goals based on thorough testing to determine minimum realistic and feasible times required to accomplish missions.

Red Team non-military forms of war 

The Soviets believe that they have more strength in their non-military forms of war in comparison to the Western countries. Because of this belief, the Soviets maximized the use of these forms of war. The following three non-military forms of war can be found in Section V, Red Strategic Plan, of the declassified Proud Prophet government document.

1. Economic - Use Western weaknesses in financial structure and energy resources as levers to create unemployment, panic and clashes between peoples and governments.

2. Cultural - Use cultural concerns as psychological levers to prevent western use of nuclear weapons.

3. Political - Manipulate local political interests, as well as groups and individuals.

Outcome 
Proud Prophet made the year of 1983 a dangerous year. There were events such as the one which involved Korean Air Flight 007. Following that, was the "Petrov incident" and the Able Archer incident. These events proved that the players of Proud Prophet did not realize how obsessed and potentially dangerous the Soviet leaders were becoming. Many of the strategic concepts that were meant to deal with the Soviet Union were sorted out and revealed as either irresponsible or completely incompatible with current United States capabilities, and were immediately thrown out. There were proposed strategies such as launching on warning, which were quickly disposed of. Authorities were not comfortable with the idea of letting computers connected to a radar system, have the ability to launch missiles. Another strategy that did not last long involved attacking Moscow, in hopes of knocking it out as a command center. The Soviets had more than 30,000 nuclear weapons. It was felt that they would find a way to retaliate against the United States. There was the impression that sending NATO armies into Eastern Europe was an appealing option until someone gamed it out and figured out that this strategy was not effective against a much larger Soviet army in Eastern Europe, categorizing it as suicide. Other strategies such as launch on warning, early use of nuclear weapons, tit-for-tat nuclear exchanges, and horizontal escalation were eventually banished. After Proud Prophet, there was no more over-the-top nuclear rhetoric traced to the United States.

According to participant Paul Bracken, limited de-escalatory nuclear strikes were the most notable strategic proposal during Proud Prophet. The idea behind this strategy was that if Soviet authorities found that the West was about to go nuclear, they would come to their senses and accept a ceasefire. This was supposed to limit nuclear war. Unfortunately, it did not play out that way. The team representing the Soviet Union interpreted limited nuclear strikes as an attack and threat on their nation, way of life, and honor. This led the team representing the Soviet Union to respond to the United States with an enormous nuclear salvo, which then led the United States to retaliate. The result was nothing less than a catastrophe.

In the book, The Second Nuclear Age: Strategy, Danger, and the New Power Politics, Paul Bracken claimed that Proud Prophet had a chastening and moderating impact on the Reagan's administration's rhetoric and thinking on nuclear war, but that was not all it did. According to Bracken's interpretation of Proud Prophet's outcome, the standard policies followed by chairman of the Joint Chiefs John William Vessey and Secretary of Defense Caspar W. Weinberger inevitably led to an escalated conflict between the United States and the Soviet Union. During the game, their actions ultimately initiated a major nuclear war. Bracken claims that the result of Proud Prophet was a catastrophe, due to the numbers of individuals affected. Estimates made from the game showed half a billion human beings killed in initial exchanges, more than half a billion people dying subsequently from radiation and starvation and major parts of the Northern Hemisphere becoming uninhabitable, for decades. The chairman of the Joint Chiefs John William Vessey spent the next several years revitalizing and revamping the United States' war plans. Nuclear threats were gone and the new emphasis was focused on meeting Soviet conventional strength with the United States' conventional forces and following a long-term competitive strategy.

See also
 Cold War
 War Game
 Soviet Union
 United States of America
 Team B
 Reagan Administration
 Obama Administration
 Nuclear Warfare
 Military
 Communist Party
 George H. W. Bush
 Able Archer
 RYAN
 KAL-007

References

External links 
 Proud Prophet - 83 

1983 in military history
Military exercises involving the United States
Cold War military history of the United States
1983 in the United States
Nuclear strategy
Presidency of Ronald Reagan
War scare